The following are the national records in athletics in Nepal maintained by Nepal Amateur Athletics Association (NAAA).

Outdoor
Key to tables:

+ = en route to a longer distance

h = hand timing

Men

Women

Indoor

Men

Women

Notes

References
General
World Athletics Statistic Handbook 2019: National Outdoor Records
World Athletics Statistic Handbook 2022: National Indoor Records
Specific

External links
 Nepali Records

Nepal
Records
Athletics
Athletics